Charles Cooper Nott may refer to:

 Charles C. Nott, Sr. (1827–1916), Chief Justice of the United States Court of Claims
 Charles Cooper Nott, Jr. (1869–1957), Assistant District Attorney and Judge of the New York General Sessions Court